Ambur Braid (born Amber Dionne Braid;) is a Canadian soprano.

Early life and education
Braid was born in Terrace, British Columbia. She studied at The Royal Conservatory of Music Glenn Gould School with Donna Sherman from 2002–2006, where she achieved her Bachelor of Music and Artist Diploma in Voice Performance.  

She then went on to study with Wendy Hillhouse at the San Francisco Conservatory of Music from 2006–2008, where she attained her Master of Music. She then continued her studies at Operaworks with Ann Baltz, the Opera Workshop in St. Andrews-By-The-Sea with Wendy Nielsen, the Canadian Opera Company Ensemble Studio (2010–2013) and the Ravinia Festival's Steans Institute (2012). 

From 2014–2016, Ambur moved to Athens, Greece to work with Marina Krilovici on a repertoire shift to roles like Salome (Strauss) and the title role in Puccini's Tosca.

Career
After completing her Master of Music degree, Ambur made her professional debut with Opera Atelier as Diane in Gluck's Iphigénie en Tauride in 2009.  

As an alumna of the Canadian Opera Company's Ensemble Studio program, Ambur has a close relationship with the company, having performed Amor (Orfeo ed Euridice (2011), directed by Robert Carsen, conducted by Harry Bicket), the Queen of the Night (The Magic Flute (2011, 2017), conducted by Johannes Debus), the Greek Woman (Iphigénie en Tauride (2011) with Pablo Heras-Casado/Robert Carsen), Semele (Semele (2012), conducted by Rinaldo Alessandrini), Adele (Die Fledermaus (2012), directed by Christopher Alden), and Vitellia (La Clemenza di Tito, 2013) with them.

Ambur made her European debut in Lisbon in a new production of The Rake's Progress as Anne Trulove, conducted by Joana Carneiro at Teatro Nacional de São Carlos (2015), and her UK opera debut at the English National Opera as The Queen of Night in Simon McBurney's The Magic Flute in 2016.  She made her USA opera debut with the Arizona Opera in 2014 as Violetta in Verdi's La traviata.

From 2016–2018, Ambur was highlighted in various productions of Mozart's The Magic Flute as The Queen of the Night (Oper Frankfurt, Calgary Opera, and Canadian Opera Company). The 2016/2017 and 2017/2018 seasons also included multiple role debuts for Braid, such as Dalinda (Ariodante, Canadian Opera Company), Die Königin/Queen (Das geheimes Königreich, Oper Frankfurt), Elisabetta (Roberto Devereaux, Oper Frankfurt), and Tosca (titular role, Calgary Opera). All debut performances were highly acclaimed, with reviews praising her for her emotional nuance, vocal power, and strong stage presence. 

The 2018/2019 season saw Braid singing in productions of Wagner’s Die Walküre (Helmwige) and Maderna’s Satyricon (Scintilla) at Oper Frankfurt.

A highlight of that season, Braid starred in the role of Sabina in the world premiere of Rufus Wainwright’s Hadrian at the Canadian Opera Company (directed by Peter Hinton, conducted by Johannes Debus). The star-studded cast featured Thomas Hampson (Hadrian) and Karita Mattila (Plotina) in their company debuts alongside Braid.

In recent seasons, Braid returned to Oper Frankfurt to take on the titular role in Barrie Kosky's new production of Salome (2020, conducted Joana Mallwitz) and reprise her role in Krenek's Das geheimes Königreich.

Other Work 
A strong advocate for getting younger audiences into classical arts, Ambur is a believer in all forms of collaborative art and has performed with Broken Social Scene, The Arkells, Austra, Dragonette, and The Sam Roberts Band.

During the COVID-19 pandemic, Braid began an outdoor concert festival Opera in the Wild, in an effort to feature local, Canadian talent and emerging young artists. 

Braid also collaborated on the Starry Opera Night (2020) project with musician/producer Dan Kurtz and designer Isaac Rayment. This immersive event utilized the projection work of the Van Gogh projection installation in Toronto.

Film 
Ambur is featured in the 2017 film The Upside, starring Bryan Cranston and Kevin Hart.

Repertory 

Braid's repertoire includes:

 Soprano Soloists, Ninth Symphony (Beethoven)                             
 Elisabetta, Roberto Devereux (Donizetti)
 Amor, Orfeo ed Euridice (Gluck)  
 Diana, Iphigénie en Tauride (Gluck) 
 Aci, Aci, Galatea e Poliferno (Handel) 
 Dalinda, Ariodante (Handel)  
 Semele, Semele (Handel)  
 Die Königin, Das geheimes Königreich (Krenek) 
 Scintilla, Satyricon (Maderna)  
 Konstanze, The Abduction of the Seraglio (Mozart)
 Elettra, Idomeneo (Mozart)
 Queen of the Night, The Magic Flute (Mozart)
 Vitellia, La Clemenza di Tito (Mozart)             
 Tosca, Tosca (Puccini)                                             
 Adele, Die Fledermaus (J. Strauss)                                                           
 Salome, Salome (R. Strauss)                               
 Anne Trulove, The Rake's Progress (Stravinsky)
 Violetta, La Traviata (Verdi)                                                   
 Helmwige, Die Walküre (Wagner)
 Sabina, Hadrian (Wainwright)

Ambur's full repertoire list and stage credits can be found on her website or on OperaBase.

Recognition and awards
 2013: Third Prize, Christina and Louis Quilico Awards 
 2008: Winner San Francisco Conservatory Concerto Competition
 2006: Palm Beach Opera, Junior Division

References

External links 
 Ambur Braid Official Website
 Harrison Parrott Artist Management

1983 births
Living people
21st-century Canadian women opera singers
Canadian operatic sopranos
Musicians from British Columbia
People from Terrace, British Columbia